Girls Inc. (established in 1864) is a United States 501(c)(3) nonprofit organization which encourages girls to be "Strong, Smart, and Bold" through direct service and advocacy. The organization prioritizes equipping girls with the skills to navigate through economic, gender, and social barriers and to grow up as independent individuals. It is one of the longest continuously operating organizations offering girls-only programming.

History 
The Girls Inc. (Girls Club of America) movement was founded in 1864 in Waterbury, Connecticut. The organization's mission was to help young women who had migrated from rural communities in search of job opportunities experiencing upheaval in the aftermath of the Civil War. In 1945, fourteen charter Girls Clubs joined together to form a national organization. In 1990 the Girls Club of America changed their name to Girls Incorporated. Across the decades, they adapted to meet specific environmental challenges girls and young women faced, working in partnership with schools and communities.

Notable contributors
The most recognized contributor to Girls Inc. is Rachel Harris Johnson.  In 1919, she became secretary of the Worcester Girls Club, which her mother helped found. She later became the club's president and in 1945 formed a national organization and served as its first president until 1952. Johnson died at the age of 95 in a nursing home.

The president and CEO of Girls, Inc. is Stephanie Hull, Prior to joining Girls, Inc., she served as Executive Vice President and Chief Operating Officer at Woodrow Wilson National Fellowship Foundation. She succeeded Judy Vredenburgh, who had been at Girls, Inc. since 2010.

Local affiliates

The first Girls Club opened in 1864 and has been nationally recognized since 1945. Girls Inc. has a network of local organizations in the United States and Canada. Affiliates are found across the United States and Canada. A local organization was recently launched in Chicago.

Governance
Girls, Inc. is governed by a dual governance structure, composed of the National Council and the National Board.

The National Council, composed of 300 voting members, makes decisions concerning the purpose, goals, and public policies of the organization. They elect the National Board, the officers of the Council and the Board Development Committee. They also vote to amend the bylaws of the organization, which requires a two-thirds majority. The council meets every two years and at least 75 delegates must be present for the meeting to be called to order 45 days before each council meeting, the agenda and items to be voted upon are sent out.

The National Board must have between twenty and forty members. The board includes five officers, eight regional representatives, and up to 27 members at-large. The President/CEO is considered a voting member of the board, which meets quarterly, with the spring meeting being the annual meeting. Eleven members in attendance constitute a quorum. The board functions in the same manner as an executive committee of a corporation.

Notable supporters 
In September 2006, Warren Buffett auctioned his Lincoln Town Car to support Girls Inc. The vehicle sold for $73,200 on eBay. In 2015, Warren Buffett auctioned his Cadillac to support Girls Inc., which sold for $122,500.00 on Proxibid.com.

In March 2017, Hillary Clinton was named as the "Champion for Girls" by Girls Inc. at their 2017 New York Luncheon.

In February 2013 the DPR Foundation gave the Girls Inc. of Orange County a $30,000 check. The Girls Inc. organization admired the donation and explained how much of an impact it would make for further purchases.

Partner companies and controversy
Girls Inc. often participate in efforts with partner companies that promote positive change for women, often through events such as raising money through charity sales or donating. Some of Girls Inc.’s partner companies include Dove, Cummins, Freeform, Business Wire, Motorola Foundation, American Chemical Society, NPower, Adventures of the Mind, Nonprofit VOTE and Space Science Laboratory.

A venture with the American Girl Dolls collection in 2005 generated controversy among fundamentalist Christians. The American Family Association urged its members to demand that American Girl halt support for Girls Inc., accusing it of being "a pro-abortion, pro-lesbian advocacy group."

Awards and acknowledgements
Girls Inc. has received a 4-star rating from Charity Navigator, and a "Platinum" status from GuideStar.

Programs
In 1970s, the organization developed a number of programs in six main areas: 1) careers and life planning, 2) health and sexuality, 3) leadership and community action, 4) sports and adventure, 5) self-reliance and life skills, and 6) culture and heritage. As of 2019, it had the following programs:

 National Scholars Program - offers scholarships to female high school seniors graduating from affiliate high schools located throughout the U.S. and Canada.
 Eureka! Program - combines intensive summer camp experiences in STEM (Science, technology, engineering, and mathematics) with school-year seminars, field trips, speakers, and activities. Launched in 2010 and funded by Clinton Foundation, it is supported by several universities and corporations.
 Economic Literacy - teaches girls about financial management and independence. 
 Friendly PEERsuasion - helps girls aged 11-14 to avoid harmful substance use.
 Leadership and Community Action
 Media Literacy
 Operation SMART
 Preventing Adolescent Pregnancy
 Project Bold - a violence-prevention and self-defense program.
 Bold Futures - after-school mentoring program.
 Girls Inc. Sporting Champs

See also 
 Bristol Girls' Club
 Eloise B. Houchens Center

References

External links 
 

Youth organizations based in the United States
Youth empowerment organizations
Women's organizations based in the United States
Youth organizations established in 1945
1864 establishments in Connecticut